Craig W. Spitzer (born December 18, 1945) is an American former professional basketball player.

A 7'0" center from Tulane University, Spitzer spent one season (1967-68) with the Chicago Bulls of the National Basketball Association (NBA). He averaged 1.8 points and 2.4 rebounds.

Following his NBA career, Spitzer played for two seasons in the Continental Basketball Association (CBA) and then professionally in Israel, Sweden, the Netherlands and France. He retired from playing in 1980 and became a basketball agent in France.

References

External links
College statistics

1945 births
Living people
American expatriate basketball people in France
American men's basketball players
Centers (basketball)
Chicago Bulls players
Phoenix Suns expansion draft picks
Tulane Green Wave men's basketball players
Undrafted National Basketball Association players